The St. Michael's Episcopal Church in Anaheim, California, also known as The Chapel at St. Michael's Episcopal Church, is a historic church at 311 West South Street.  It was built in 1876 and was added to the National Register of Historic Places in 2004.

It is a wood-frame building which is "a modest vernacular example of the Gothic Revival style popular in the mid to late nineteenth century."  It has a gable front with a bell tower topped by a pyramidal roof.  It has a Gothic arch entryway and double-lancet windows.

See also
National Register of Historic Places listings in Orange County, California

References

External links

Buildings and structures in Anaheim, California
Tourist attractions in Anaheim, California
Carpenter Gothic church buildings in California
Episcopal church buildings in California
National Register of Historic Places in Orange County, California
Churches on the National Register of Historic Places in California
Churches completed in 1876
19th-century Episcopal church buildings
Churches in Orange County, California
History of Anaheim, California